Lees Lick is an unincorporated community in Harrison County, Kentucky, in the United States.

History
Lees Lick was described in 1877 as a small settlement which contained only one store. A post office was established as Leeslick in 1888, and remained in operation until it was discontinued in 1901.

References

Unincorporated communities in Harrison County, Kentucky
Unincorporated communities in Kentucky